Zimmedaaar is a 1990 Indian Bollywood film directed and produced by Santosh Kumar Chauhan. It stars Rajiv Kapoor, Anita Raj and Kimi Katkar in pivotal roles. After this movie, Rajiv Kapoor did not feature in any films for over thirty years. This was also his last film to be released when he was alive. His final film, Toolsidas Junior (2022) was released posthumously a year after Kapoor died in February 2021.

Cast

 Rajiv Kapoor as Inspector Rajiv
 Anita Raj as Anita
 Kimi Katkar as Tina
 Ranjeet as Ranjeet Singh
 Vinod Mehra as Inspector Prakash Verma
 Biswajeet as Chief Inspector
 Tej Sapru as Jagpal
 Rajendra Nath as Press Editor
 Dinesh Hingoo as Cameo, in song "Dua Karna"
 Tom Alter as Mr Marcos
 Bhushan Tiwari as Goga
 Viju Khote as Vijoo Assistant Diamond stealer
 Narendra Nath as Goga Assistant Diamond Stealer
 Mac Mohan
 Sudhir as Raghu
 Bob Christo
 Manik Irani as Indian Army Soldier

Music

References

External links

1990s Hindi-language films
1990 films
Films scored by Anu Malik